The Wangpicheon River (왕피천) is a river in southeastern South Korea. It flows from Yeongyang County, North Gyeongsang Province, passes through Uljin County to the Sea of Japan, covering a distance of about 61 km. The river basins are currently designated as ecological and landscape preservation areas. The Wangpicheon watershed covers roughly 513.71 km2. It has excellent vegetation and natural scenery, and endangered species such as otter, goat, hawk, and rare plants live in the area, as well as a community of many species of fish.

See also 
List of rivers of Korea

References

External links 
Naver Cast : Travel - Wangpicheon
Introduction of the Wangpicheon River

Rivers of North Gyeongsang Province
Yeongyang County
Uljin County